Angelos Mavropoulos (1901 in Asia Minor (now Turkey) – 5 March 1979 in Athens, Greece) was a Greek actor. He performed in both theatre and film.

Filmography

References

External links

1901 births
1979 deaths
Greeks from the Ottoman Empire
20th-century Greek male actors
Emigrants from the Ottoman Empire to Greece